Joseph Leslie Sample (February 1, 1939 – September 12, 2014) was an American keyboardist and composer. He was one of the founding members of The Jazz Crusaders in 1960, the band which shortened its name to "The Crusaders" in 1971. He remained a part of the group until its final album in 1991 (not including the 2003 reunion album Rural Renewal).

Beginning in the late 1960s, he enjoyed a successful solo career and guested on many recordings by other performers and groups, including Miles Davis, George Benson, Jimmy Witherspoon, Michael Franks, B. B. King, Eric Clapton, Steely Dan, Joni Mitchell, Anita Baker, and the Supremes. Sample incorporated gospel, blues, jazz, latin, and classical forms into his music.

Biography

Sample was born in Houston, Texas, the youngest son of Alexander Sample, a mail-carrier, and Agatha (née Osborne) Sample, a seamstress. Sample began to play the piano at the age of five. He was a student of the organist and pianist (Theodore or T.) Curtis Mayo.

In high school in the 1950s, Sample teamed up with friends saxophonist Wilton Felder and drummer "Stix" Hooper to form a group called the Swingsters. While studying piano at Texas Southern University, Sample met and added trombonist Wayne Henderson and several other players to the Swingsters, which became the Modern Jazz Sextet and then the Jazz Crusaders, in emulation of one of the leading progressive jazz bands of the day, Art Blakey's Jazz Messengers. Sample never took a degree from the university; instead, in 1960, he and the Jazz Crusaders made the move from Houston to Los Angeles. He was a member of Phi Beta Sigma fraternity.

The group quickly found opportunities on the West Coast, making its first recording, Freedom Sound, in 1961 and releasing up to four albums a year over much of the 1960s. The Jazz Crusaders played at first in the dominant hard bop style of the day, standing out by virtue of their unusual front-line combination of saxophone (played by Wilton Felder) and Henderson's trombone. Another distinctive quality was the funky, rhythmically appealing acoustic piano playing of Sample, who helped steer the group's sound into a fusion between jazz and soul in the late 1960s. The Jazz Crusaders became a strong concert draw during those years.

While Sample and his bandmates continued to work together, he and the other band members pursued individual work as well. In 1969, Sample made his first recording under his own name; Fancy Dance featured the pianist as part of a jazz trio. In the 1970s, as the Jazz Crusaders became simply the Crusaders and branched out into popular sounds, Sample became known as a Los Angeles studio musician, appearing on recordings by Joni Mitchell, Marvin Gaye, Tina Turner, B. B. King, Joe Cocker, Minnie Riperton, Anita Baker and The Supremes. Sample was a founding member of the L.A. Express, which was started as the backing band for Tom Scott; however, both Sample and fellow Crusader Larry Carlton left after that group's first album. In 1975, Sample went into the studios with jazz musicians Ray Brown, on bass, and drummer Shelly Manne to produce a then state-of-the-art recording direct to disc entitled The Three. About this time Blue Note Records reissued some of the early work by the Jazz Crusaders as The Young Rabbits. This was a compilation of their recordings produced between 1962 and 1968.

The electric keyboard was fairly new in the 1960s, and Sample became one of the instrument's pioneers. He began to use the electric piano while the group retained their original name, and the group hit a commercial high-water mark with the hit single "Street Life" and the album of the same name in 1979. In 1978, he recorded Swing Street Café with guitarist David T. Walker.

The Crusaders, after losing several key members, broke up after recording Life in the Modern World for the GRP label in 1987. Despite the disbanding of the Crusaders, the members would join each other to record periodically over the years, releasing Healing the Wounds in the early 1990s. Felder, Hooper, and Sample recorded their first album, called Rural Renewal, as the reunited Crusaders group in 2003 and played a concert in Japan in 2004.

After Sample's Fancy Dance (1969), he recorded several solo albums, including Sample This, produced by George Duke.

GRP also released Joe Sample Collection, and a three-disc Crusaders Collection, as testament to Sample's enduring legacy. Some of the pianist's recent recordings are The Song Lives On (1999), featuring duets with singer Lalah Hathaway, and The Pecan Tree (2002), a tribute to his hometown of Houston, where he relocated in 1994. His 2004 album on Verve, Soul Shadows, paid tribute to Duke Ellington and Jelly Roll Morton, and pre-jazz bandleader James Reese Europe. In 2007, he recorded Feeling Good with vocalist Randy Crawford. In the mid-1970s, the Crusaders added guitarist Larry Carlton.

Sample appeared on stage at the Waterfront Hall in Belfast, Northern Ireland, on 28 May 2000, playing keyboard solo on George Benson's "Deeper Than You Think". This concert was recorded and a DVD entitled George Benson: Absolutely Live was subsequently released. A studio version of "Deeper Than You Think" was recorded featuring Joe Sample in New York in May 1999 during sessions for a Benson collection that took the title Absolute Benson.

Some of Sample's works were featured on The Weather Channel's "Local on the 8s" segments and his song "Rainbow Seeker" is included in their 2008 compilation release, The Weather Channel Presents: Smooth Jazz II. Nicole Kidman sang his song "One Day I'll Fly Away" in the Baz Luhrmann film Moulin Rouge! (2001). The popular "In All My Wildest Dreams", also from the 1978 album Rainbow Seeker, was sampled on Tupac's "Dear Mama", De La Soul's "WRMS's Dedication to the Bitty", Toni Braxton's "What's Good" and Arrested Development's "Africa's Inside Me".

Sample died of mesothelioma in Houston, Texas, at the age of 75. At the time of his death, Sample had been working on a project, "Quadroon," with singer-songwriter Jonatha Brooke.

Personal life 
His survivors included his son, bassist Nicklas Sample (with ex-wife Marianne), who is a member of the Coryell Auger Sample Trio featuring Julian Coryell and Karma Auger. He also left a wife, Yolanda, and three stepsons: Justin, Jamerson III and Jordan Berry.

Sample was Catholic, and supported Catholic charities and churches throughout his life.

Discography

As leader

With The (Jazz) Crusaders
 Freedom Sound (Pacific Jazz, 1961)
 Lookin' Ahead (Pacific Jazz, 1962)
 The Jazz Crusaders at the Lighthouse (Pacific Jazz, 1962)
 Tough Talk (Pacific Jazz, 1963)
 Heat Wave (Pacific Jazz, 1963)
 Jazz Waltz (Pacific Jazz, 1963) with Les McCann
 Stretchin' Out (Pacific Jazz, 1964)
 The Thing (Pacific Jazz, 1965)
 Chile Con Soul (Pacific Jazz, 1965)
 Live at the Lighthouse '66 (Pacific Jazz, 1966)
 Talk That Talk (Pacific Jazz, 1966)
 The Festival Album (Pacific Jazz, 1966)
 Uh Huh (Pacific Jazz, 1967)
 Lighthouse '68 (Pacific Jazz, 1968)
 Powerhouse (Pacific Jazz, 1969)
 Lighthouse '69 (Pacific Jazz, 1969)
 Give Peace a Chance (Liberty, 1970) 
 Old Socks New Shoes – New Socks Old Shoes (Chisa, 1970)
 Pass the Plate (Chisa, 1971)
 Hollywood (MoWest, 1972)
 Crusaders 1 (Blue Thumb, 1972)
 The 2nd Crusade (Blue Thumb, 1973)
 Unsung Heroes (Blue Thumb, 1973)
 Scratch (Blue Thumb, 1974)
 Southern Comfort (Blue Thumb, 1974)
 Chain Reaction (ABC/Blue Thumb, 1975)
 Those Southern Knights (ABC/Blue Thumb, 1976)
 Free as the Wind (ABC/Blue Thumb, 1977)
 Images (ABC/Blue Thumb, 1978)
 Street Life (MCA, 1979)
 Rhapsody and Blues (MCA, 1980)
 Standing Tall (MCA, 1981)
 Ongaku Kai - Live in Japan (Crusaders, 1981; GRP, 1993)
 Royal Jam (MCA, 1982) with B.B. King
 Ghetto Blaster (MCA, 1984)
 The Good and the Bad Times (MCA, 1986)
 Life in the Modern World (MCA, 1988)
 Healing the Wounds (GRP, 1991)
 Rural Renewal (Verve, 2003)

With CreoleJoe Band
 CreoleJoe Band (PRA, 2013)

As sideman 

With Anita Baker
 Rhythm of Love (Elektra, 1994)
 Christmas Fantasy (Blue Note, 2005)

With George Benson
 20/20 (Warner Bros., 1985)
 Absolute Benson (Verve, 2000)
 Guitar Man (Concord, 2011)

With Joan Baez
 Diamonds & Rust (A&M, 1975)
 Blowin' Away (Portrait, 1977)

With Cher
 Bittersweet White Light (MCA, 1973)
 Stars (Warner Bros., 1975)

With Eric Clapton
 Pilgrim (Reprise, 1998)
 Reptile (Reprise, 2001)

With Natalie Cole
 Unforgettable... with Love (Elektra, 1991)
 Ask a Woman Who Knows (Verve, 2002)

With Randy Crawford
 Everything Must Change (Warner Bros., 1976)
 Now We May Begin (Warner Bros., 1980)
 Through the Eyes of Love (Warner Bros., 1992)
 Feeling Good (PRA, 2007)
 No Regrets (PRA, 2009)
 Live (PRA, 2012)

With Michael Franks
 The Art of Tea (Reprise, 1975)
 Sleeping Gypsy (Warner Bros., 1977)

With Albert King
 Albert (Utopia, 1976)
 Truckload of Lovin (Utopia, 1976)With B.B. King Midnight Believer (ABC, 1978)
 Take It Home (MCA, 1979)
 There Is Always One More Time (MCA, 1991)
 Reflections (MCA, 2003)With Blue Mitchell Blues' Blues (Mainstream, 1972)
 Graffiti Blues (Mainstream, 1973)With Joni Mitchell Court and Spark (Elektra, 1974)
 The Hissing of Summer Lawns (Elektra, 1975)With Steely Dan Aja (ABC 1977)
 Gaucho (MCA, 1980) – rec. 1978–80With Rod Stewart Stardust: The Great American Songbook, Volume III (J, 2004)
 Fly Me to the Moon... The Great American Songbook Volume V (J, 2010)With others'''
 Gene Ammons, Free Again (Prestige, 1971)
 Paul Anka, The Painter (United Artists, 1976)
 Herb Alpert, Rise (A&M, 1979)
 Solomon Burke, Electronic Magnetism (MGM, 1971)
 Kenny Burrell, 'Round Midnight (Fantasy, 1972)
 Jerry Butler, Power Of Love (Mercury, 1973)
 Dion DiMucci, Born to Be with You (Phil Spector, 1975)
 Marvin Gaye, Let's Get It On (Motown, 1973)
 Richard "Groove" Holmes, Welcome Home (World Pacific, 1968)
 Bobby Hutcherson, San Francisco (Blue Note, 1971)
 Milt Jackson, Memphis Jackson (Impulse!, 1969)
 Al Jarreau, Tenderness (Reprise, 1994)
 Gloria Jones, Windstorm (Capitol, 1978)
 B.B. King and Eric Clapton, Riding with the King (except tracks 3, 4, 8) (Reprise, 2000)
 Harold Land, The Peace-Maker (Cadet, 1968)
 Melissa Manchester, Don't Cry Out Loud (Arista, 1978)
 Carmen McRae, Can't Hide Love (Blue Note, 1976)
 Martha Reeves, Martha Reeves (MCA, 1974)
 Minnie Riperton, Adventures in Paradise (Epic, 1975)
 The Rippingtons, Welcome to the St. James' Club (GRP, 1990)
 Johnny Rivers, Outside Help (Big Tree, 1977)
 Brenda Russell, Get Here (A&M, 1988) – rec. 1985–87
 Ringo Starr, Stop and Smell the Roses (RCA, 1981)
 Boz Scaggs, Slow Dancer (Columbia, 1974)
 Lalo Schifrin, Enter the Dragon (soundtrack) (Warner Bros., 1973)
 Sonny & Cher, Mama Was a Rock and Roll Singer, Papa Used to Write All Her Songs (MCA, 1973)
 Dusty Springfield, It Begins Again (Mercury, 1978)
 Tina Turner, Private Dancer (Capitol, 1984)
 Stanley Turrentine, Everybody Come On Out'' (Fantasy, 1976)

References

External links

 
 Joe Sample biography at Verve Records
 
 

1939 births
2014 deaths
African-American pianists
American jazz pianists
American male pianists
Smooth jazz pianists
American organists
American male organists
20th-century American keyboardists
Musicians from Houston
Deaths from mesothelioma
Deaths from cancer in Texas
Musicians from Texas
20th-century American pianists
Blue Thumb Records artists
ABC Records artists
GRP Records artists
Warner Records artists
Verve Records artists
MCA Records artists
American male jazz musicians
21st-century American keyboardists
The Crusaders members
L.A. Express members
20th-century American male musicians
21st-century American male musicians
African-American Catholics
20th-century African-American musicians
21st-century African-American musicians